The surname Jarrett is thought to be a variant of Garrett, from either of two Germanic personal names introduced to Britain by the Normans: Gerard, composed of the elements gar, ger 'spear', 'lance' + hard 'hardy', 'brave', 'strong'; and Gerald, composed of the elements gar, ger 'spear', 'lance' + wald 'rule'. Variants include Jarratt, Jarret and Jarrott.

Notable people with the names include:

Notable people with the surname "Jarrett" include

A
Albert Jarrett (born 1984), Sierra Leonean footballer
Andrew Jarrett (born 1958), English tennis player
Art Jarrett (1907–1987), American singer
Arthur Jarrett (disambiguation), multiple people

B
Beaumont Jarrett (1855–1905), English footballer
Bede Jarrett (1881–1934), English priest
Bella Jarrett (1926–2007), American actress and author
Benjamin Jarrett (1881–1944), American politician
Berrie H. Jarrett (1894–1927), American naval officer
Bryan L. Jarrett, American attorney

C
Clifford Jarrett (1909–1995), British civil servant
Cole Jarrett (born 1983), Canadian ice hockey player
Craig Jarrett (born 1979), American football player

D
Dale Jarrett (born 1956), American auto racing driver
Daniel Jarrett (1886–1938), American screenwriter
David Jarrett (born 1952), English teacher
Derek Jarrett (1928–2004), English historian and author
Doug Jarrett (born 1944), Canadian ice hockey player
Dwayne Jarrett (born 1986), American football player

F
Fred Jarrett, American politician

G
Gary Jarrett (born 1942), Canadian ice hockey player
Gene Andrew Jarrett (born 1975), American professor
Geoffrey Jarrett (born 1937), Australian bishop
Glenn Jarrett (born 1950), American auto racing driver
Grady Jarrett (born 1993), American football player
Graham Jarrett (1937–2004), English cricketer
Greg Jarrett (radio personality) (born 1952), American radio host
Gregg Jarrett (born 1955), American news commentator

H
Hal Jarrett (1907–1983), South African cricketer
Hanson Jarrett (1837–1890), English soldier
Harry B. Jarrett (1898–1974), American admiral
H. Marshall Jarrett (born 1945), American lawyer

I
Ilisha Jarrett (born 1977), American basketball player

J
Jaiquawn Jarrett (born 1989), American football player
James H. Jarrett (1832–1922), American politician and physician
James Henry Jarrett (1895–1943), British colonial administrator
Jason Jarrett (disambiguation), multiple people
Jeff Jarrett (born 1967), American professional wrestler
Jeffrey D. Jarrett, American politician
Jerry Jarrett (1942–2023), American professional wrestler and promoter
Jim Jarrett (born 1938), American athletic administrator
John Jarrett (born 1970), American skier
Jovanee Jarrett (born 1983), Jamaican long jumper

K
Karen Jarrett (born 1972), American professional wrestling manager
Keith Jarrett (born 1945), American pianist and composer
Keith Jarrett (rugby) (born 1948), Welsh rugby union footballer
Kemar Jarrett (born 1982), Jamaican criminal
Kyshoen Jarrett (born 1993), American football player

L
Laureen Jarrett (born 1938), Canadian teacher
Len Jarrett, English civil servant
Link Jarrett (born 1972), American baseball coach
Luther M. Jarrett (1804–1854), American politician

M
Major Jarrett (??–1839), Jamaican criminal
Marilyn Jarrett (1939–2006), American businesswoman and politician
Martin L. Jarrett (1841–1920), American politician and physician
Martyn Jarrett (born 1944), English bishop
Mary Cromwell Jarrett (1877–1961), American social worker
Michael Jarrett (born 1972), English doctor and cricketer
Michael Jarrett (archaeologist) (1934–1994), British archaeologist

N
Ned Jarrett (born 1932), American auto racing driver

P
Patrick Jarrett (born 1972), Jamaican sprinter
Paul Jarrett (born 1981), American entrepreneur
Philip Jarrett, English author and aviation historian

R
Rakim Jarrett (born 2001), American football player
Rebecca Jarrett (1846–1928), British activist
Red Jarrett (1907–1962), American football player
Renne Jarrett (born 1946), American actress
Rianna Jarrett (born 1994), Irish footballer
Richard Jarrett (1870–??), Welsh footballer
Rollin Jarrett (born 1960), American screenwriter
Ryan Jarrett (born 1983), American cowboy

S
Sean Jarrett (born 1984), American baseball player
Stanford Jarrett (born 1977), Montserratian footballer

T
Ted Jarrett (1925–2009), American singer-songwriter
Thelma Eileen Jarrett (1905–1987), Australian volunteer
Thomas Jarrett (1805–1882), English religious figure
T. J. Jarrett, American writer
Todd Jarrett, American competitive shooter
Tony Jarrett (born 1968), English sprinter
Tristan Jarrett (born 1998), American basketball player
Tyrique Jarrett (born 1994), American football player

V
Valerie Jarrett (born 1956), American businesswoman
Vernon Jarrett (1918–2004), American journalist

W
Wayne Jarrett (born 1956), Jamaican musician
William Jarrett (disambiguation), multiple people
Winston Jarrett (born 1940), Jamaican singer

Jarratt
Alex Jarratt (1924–2019), British businessman
George Jarratt (1891–1917), English soldier
Grahame Jarratt (1929–2011), New Zealand rower
Jan Jarratt (born 1958), Australian politician
John Jarratt (born 1951), Australian actor
Melynda Jarratt (born 1961), Canadian historian
Steve Jarratt, British journalist
Susan Jarratt, American professor
Wayne Jarratt (1957–1988), Australian actor

Jarret
Gabriel Jarret (born 1970), American actor

Jarrott
Alan Jarrott (born 1956), Australian rules footballer
Charles Jarrott (1927–2011), English film director
Charles Jarrott (racing driver) (1877–1944), English racing driver

Fictional characters
Melissa Jarrett, a fictional character in the soap opera Neighbours

See also 
 Jarrett (given name), a page for people with the given name "Jarrett"
 Jarrett (disambiguation), a disambiguation page for "Jarrett"